Louiza Bayou (born May 25, 1994) is an Algerian volleyball player at ASW Bejaia.

References

1994 births
Volleyball players from Béjaïa
Living people
Algerian women's volleyball players
Middle blockers
21st-century Algerian people